Mitcheltree Township is one of six townships in Martin County, Indiana, United States. As of the 2010 census, its population was 624 and it contained 357 housing units.

Geography

Unincorporated towns
 Cale at 
 Indian Springs at 
 Mount Olive at 
 Trinity Springs at 
(This list is based on USGS data and may include former settlements.)

Cemeteries
The township contains these fifteen cemeteries: Bridges, Bridges, Brock, Chandler, Clarke, Dogtrot, Jackson, Little Hickory Ridge, Mountain Spring, Pleasant Grove, Rector, Roberts, Uno-Paton, Wagner and Wards.

School districts
 Shoals Community School Corporation

Political districts
 Indiana's 8th congressional district
 State House District 62
 State Senate District 48

References
 
 United States Census Bureau 2008 TIGER/Line Shapefiles
 IndianaMap

External links
 Indiana Township Association
 United Township Association of Indiana
 City-Data.com page for Mitcheltree Township

Townships in Martin County, Indiana
Townships in Indiana